Caladenia pectinata, commonly known as the king spider orchid is a species of orchid endemic to the south-west of Western Australia. It has a single erect, hairy leaf and up to three large red, yellow and pale green flowers. It is especially common between Bremer Bay and Rocky Gully.

Description 
Flowering is from late September to October.

Taxonomy and naming 
Caladenia pectinata was first formally described by Richard Rogers in 1920 and the description was published in Transactions and Proceedings of the Royal Society of South Australia. The specific epithet (pectinata) is a Latin word meaning "comb-like" referring to the fringe on the sides of the labellum.

Distribution and habitat 
The king spider orchid is widespread between Cataby and Munglinup in the Avon Wheatbelt, Esperance Plains, Geraldton Sandplains, Jarrah Forest, Mallee, Swan Coastal Plain, and Warren biogeographic regions. It is most common between Bremer Bay and Rocky Gully.

Conservation
Caladenia pectinata is classified as "not threatened" by the Western Australian Government Department of Parks and Wildlife.

References 

pectinata
Orchids of Western Australia
Endemic orchids of Australia
Plants described in 1920
Endemic flora of Western Australia